The Dissociative Experiences Scale (DES) is a psychological self-assessment questionnaire that measures dissociative symptoms.

Background
It contains twenty-eight questions and returns an overall score as well as four sub-scale results. 

DES is intended to be a screening test, since only 17% of patients with scores over 30 will be diagnosed with having dissociative identity disorder. Patients with lower scores above normal may have other post-traumatic conditions.

The DES-II contains the same questions but with a different response scale.

References

External links
 A sample adolescent DES test from Southeast Institute, Chapel Hill, NC
 International Society for the Study of Trauma and Dissociation

Psychological tests and scales
Dissociative disorders